The Heterotermitinae are a termite subfamily in the family Rhinotermitidae.

References

External links 

Termites